Chupankareh (also Romanized as Chūpānkareh; also known as Chūbānkareh) is a village in Dizajrud-e Gharbi Rural District, in the Central District of Ajab Shir County, East Azerbaijan Province, Iran. At the 2006 census, its population was 258, in 67 families.

References 

Populated places in Ajab Shir County